Max Marolt (April 16, 1936 – July 28, 2003) was an American alpine skier. He competed in two events at the 1960 Winter Olympics.

References

1936 births
2003 deaths
American male alpine skiers
Olympic alpine skiers of the United States
Alpine skiers at the 1960 Winter Olympics
Sportspeople from Aspen, Colorado